Nidelv Idrettslag is a Norwegian sports club from Trondheim, Sør-Trøndelag. It has sections for association football, team handball, floorball, track and field, weightlifting and Nordic skiing.

It was founded in 1952 as a merger between Nidarvoll IL and Tempe IL. The latter had been founded on 19 October 1930, and Nidelv counts that as its founding date.

The men's football team currently plays in the Fifth Division, the sixth tier of Norwegian football. It played in the Second Division for many years. After being relegated in 1997, it won its Third Division group in both 2000 and 2001, but both times failed to win promotion through playoffs. However, in 2002 Nidelv won their playoff. They played in the 2003 and 2004 Second Division before being relegated again.

References

 Official site 

Football clubs in Norway
Sport in Trondheim
1930 establishments in Norway
Association football clubs established in 1930
Athletics clubs in Norway